Saket Saurabh is an Indian Computer Scientist who is currently the Professor of Theoretical Computer Science at the Institute of Mathematical Sciences, Chennai (IMSc), India and an adjunct faculty at University of Bergen, Norway. He specializes in parameterized complexity, exact algorithms, graph algorithms and game theory. His fundamental contributions to the area of parameterized complexity include procedures for obtaining algorithmic lower bounds, and meta-theorems on preprocessing. Saket Saurabh was awarded the Shanti Swarup Bhatnagar Prize for Science and Technology in Mathematical Sciences in the year 2021.

Early life and education 
Saurabh was born on 23 July 1980. He hails from Hajipur district in Bihar. After initial schooling in Bihar at Kendriya Vidyalaya Sonepur, till class 9. He moved out. He obtained BSc (Honours) in mathematics and MSc in computer science from Chennai Mathematical Institute, Chennai. He also secured a PhD in theoretical computer science from IMSc in 2008. Before joining IMSc as a faculty member, Saket Saurabh had worked as a research assistant at University of Bergen during September 2006 to May 2007 and as a postdoctoral fellow at the same university during September 2007 to Sep 2009.

Awards and recognitions
ACM India Early Career Researcher (ECR) Award in 2020
Member, Academia Eurpoaea, 2020
Fellow, Indian Academy of Sciences, 2020

References

External links

21st-century Indian mathematicians
Recipients of the Shanti Swarup Bhatnagar Award in Mathematical Science
Living people
Year of birth missing (living people)